Cyphia volubilis is a species of flowering plant in the genus Cyphia, endemic to the Western Cape. It is a type of Fynbos climbing plant that uses a host to get its own flowers above ground. It has a bilabiate corolla; with 3 lobes on top and 2 at the bottom.

References 

Campanulaceae
Flora of South Africa
Fynbos
Taxa named by Nicolaas Laurens Burman